Eupremio Carruezzo (born 9 December 1969) is a retired Italian footballer who played as a forward.
He is deemed one of the best Italian players who has played in the lower divisions. He was born in Brindisi and always showed love and attachment for his homeland, although he played everywhere in Italy. 
In 2001, before joined Lucchese, rumours linked Eupremio Carruezzo to English Premier League team Manchester United, as Sir Alex Ferguson sent his assistants everywhere in Europe. Due to family reasons Eupremio was forced to reject United's bid, and alleged it as the worst regret in his career as footballer and in his whole life.

See also
Football in Italy
List of football clubs in Italy

References

External links
 Eupremio Carruezzo's profile on San Marino Calcio's official website

1969 births
Italian footballers
Living people
A.S.D. Victor San Marino players
Association football forwards